UCLA Bruins coaches may refer to:
List of UCLA Bruins football head coaches
List of UCLA Bruins men's basketball head coaches

See also
:Category:UCLA Bruins coaches